This is a list of public art in Newcastle upon Tyne, including statues, busts and other memorials. This list applies only to works of public art on permanent display in an outdoor public space and as such does not include, for example, artworks in museums.

City centre

Civic Centre

St James' Park

Quayside

References

Newcastle upon Tyne
Lists of buildings and structures in Tyne and Wear